The 2019 IndyCar Grand Prix was the fifth round of the 2019 IndyCar season. The race took place over 85 laps on the infield road course at Indianapolis Motor Speedway in Speedway, Indiana. Simon Pagenaud, who drove for Team Penske, made a late race pass on Scott Dixon to win his first race since 2017.

Results

Qualifying

Race 

Notes:  Points include 1 point for leading at least 1 lap during a race, an additional 2 points for leading the most race laps, and 1 point for Pole Position.

Championship standings after the race

Drivers' Championship standings

Manufacturer standings

 Note: Only the top five positions are included.

References 

IndyCar Grand Prix
IndyCar Grand Prix
IndyCar Grand Prix